John David Larson is a retired brigadier general in the National Guard of the United States.

Education
B.B.A., Accounting - University of Wisconsin-Madison
M.B.A., Accounting - University of Wisconsin-Madison
J.D. - University of Wisconsin Law School

Career
Larson originally jointed the United States Army Reserve in 1964 and jointed the Judge Advocate General's Corps. He would later transfer to the Wisconsin Army National Guard. Larson was promoted to Brigadier General on July 28, 1995 and his retirement was effective as of June 30, 1998.

Awards he has received include the Meritorious Service Medal, the Army Commendation Medal with two oak leaf clusters, the Army Achievement Medal, the Army Reserve Components Achievement Medal with silver oak leaf cluster, the National Defense Service Medal with service star, the Armed Forces Reserve Medal with hourglass device, the Army Service Ribbon, and the Overseas Service Ribbon.

References

Military personnel from Wisconsin
United States Army generals
United States Army Judge Advocate General's Corps
Wisconsin School of Business alumni
University of Wisconsin Law School alumni
Living people
Year of birth missing (living people)